The Wulfsen horse burial  is an early medieval horse burial, consisting of three horses, that was discovered in 1974 in a Saxon grave field in the village of Wulfsen, in the German district of Harburg. The find was rescued as a varnish profile, which is on display in the permanent exhibition of the Archaeological Museum Hamburg in Harburg, Hamburg.

Discovery 
The archaeological site was located on the northeastern escarpment of a sand pit near Wulfsen. In summer of 1974 a fossil collector observed a discoloration of the soil, which he considered of archaeological interest. He reported his observation to the Museum of the Principality of Lüneburg, which forwarded the message to the Helms-Museum in Hamburg-Harburg being the archaeological authority for the region. An excavation was conducted on the already disturbed burial site, which unearthed 35 human burials and the horse burial, containing the three horses. Due to the sandy soil, preservation of the burials was relatively poor. In total 26 older burials, oriented in north-south direction and nine younger burials oriented in east-west direction were excavated. Except for two arrowheads in a young person's grave, no other grave goods were observed.

Horse burial 
The bodies of the animals were fully decomposed, only bones and teeth remaining, but the bones were very brittle and fragile. Offerings or grave goods such as bridles were not detected. All the horses were lying on their left side, orientated in south–north direction. Their heads were placed in an upright posture on an elevated part of the pit. The middle horse was lying with its abdomen in a ventral position. The legs of the middle and eastern animal were sharply flexed. The legs of the western horse were lying in a half-extended position; it occupied about half of the pit's space. By use of a working platform, the bones were carefully exposed and soaked with cold glue, the pit was then laminated with lacquer and crêpe paper. The single bones were further secured with wires and pins. Then the pit was filled with a construction foam, secured in a wooden crate and recovered as a block. The poor preservation of the bones complicated zoological investigations. The western horse was likely a mare, the others stallions. The ages of the animals have been determined between five and seven years.

Interpretation 

Based on evidence such as mortuary practice, the geographical orientation of remains and their grave goods, the burial was dated to 700–800 AD. The younger burials especially are dated to a period shortly before the wide Christianization of the region, which resulted in fundamental changes of burial practices. The horse burial could not be clearly assigned to one of the warrior's graves, therefore it is unclear whether was an individual burial of the animals or it was an addition to one of the human interments. Funerals of animals, especially of individual horses are well known from many grave fields of the Early Middle Ages. Similar burial sites have been found in Suffolk, England. Triple horse burials, for example, were discovered near Griefstedt (Sömmerda (district)) in Thuringia and Beckum (Warendorf (district)) in North Rhine-Westphalia, but for north-eastern Lower-Saxony it is unprecedented.

A LEGO miniature of the excavation of Wulfsen horse burial was built in 2013 for the special exhibition LEGO Zeitreise (LEGO time travel) of Archäologische Museum Hamburg.

Bibliography

References 

This article has been translated in part from the German Wikipedia equivalent.

Old Saxony
Archaeology of Lower Saxony
Animal death
Archaeology of death
Archäologisches Museum Hamburg
Germanic archaeological sites
1974 archaeological discoveries
1974 in West Germany
Horses in culture
8th century in Germany
Medieval Germany